Papyrus 33 (in the Gregory-Aland numbering), designated by symbol 𝔓33, is a copy of the New Testament in Greek. It is a papyrus manuscript of the Acts of the Apostles, it contains only Acts 7:6-10.13-18; 15:21-24.26-32.  The manuscript paleographically has been assigned to the sixth century.  𝔓58 was a part of the same codex to which 𝔓33 belonged.

The Greek text of this codex is a representative of the Alexandrian text-type. Aland placed it in Category II.

It is currently housed at the Austrian National Library (Pap. G. 17973, 26133, 35831, 39783) in Vienna.

See also

 List of New Testament papyri

References

Further reading 
 C. Wessely, Studien zur Paläographie und Papyruskunde XII, (Leipzig 1912), pp. 245.

New Testament papyri
6th-century biblical manuscripts
Biblical manuscripts of the Austrian National Library
Acts of the Apostles papyri